Bramshot Halt railway station served the adjacent Bramshot Golf Course from 1913 to 1946 on the London and Southampton Railway and was located between Fleet and Farnborough in Hampshire.

History 
The station was opened on 10 May 1913 by the London and South Western Railway. It served the members of the adjacent golf club of the same name. On 4 November 1926, a milk goods train and an express passenger train collided 530 yards east of the halt. It was spelt as Bramshott Halt on tickets and Bramshot Halt on timetables, as well as in the railway handbook of 1936. Until 3 July 1938, only members were allowed to access the station. It first appeared in Bradshaw's Guide in October 1938, although it was only used by workmen of the nearby Southwood Camp. It closed on 6 May 1946 after three workers were killed and one seriously injured by a train after attempting to cross the tracks.

References 

Former London and South Western Railway stations
Railway stations in Great Britain opened in 1913
Railway stations in Great Britain closed in 1946
1913 establishments in England
1946 disestablishments in England